Elî Kaşifpûr (Ali Kashefpour) was a member of the central committee of the Kurdistan Democratic Party of Iran KDP-I. He was assassinated on August 15, 1990 in Konya.

Early life and education 

Elî Kaşifpûr was born on 24 June 1957 in the village of Piranjuq, near the city of Urmia in north-western Iran.

Elî completed his basic education in the village of hovarsin and completed his secondary education in Urmia. 
He took an entrance exam and was successfully admitted to the University of Tabriz for a degree in sociology.

After spending a year in politics, he did the entrance exam again and this time succeeded in obtaining a law degree at the University of Tehran.

He completed his degree in political law. During his last academic year, the Iranian people revolted against the Pahlavi Dynasty, which led to the establishment of the Islamic Republic.

Career 

The Kurdish people demanded freedom, equality and democracy. Elî decided to become a member of the Kurdish Democratic Party of Iran and to fight for the liberation of the Kurdish people.  Previously, with the help of his friends, he set up a library in his father's village of Hovarsin. He always encouraged young people to read and gain knowledge and believed that the reason for Kurdish backwardness was ignorance and illiteracy. During his political career he was active in Northern Kurdistan of Iran.

He participated in the 4th party congress of the party in 1979, held in Mahabad. Elî was elected as a member of the Central Committee.

Assassination 

Elî was kidnapped from his home in the Turkish city of Konya, his body was found on a roadside ditch.
Due to considerable similarities to the abduction and torture of other Turkey-based dissidents, it is widely believed that Iranian agents were responsible for the murder.

Books 
Bîranîna Elî Kaşifpûr written by Rojan Hazim

Video

References 

عه‌لی كاشف پور – Autobiography in Kurdish
Ji Bo Biranina Elî Kaşifpûr 1957-1990 - Website - Serî dana ji bo kurdistaneke serbixwe ye ter azadî, aştî û demokrasî
Abdorrahman Boroumand Center
Goran: Mehdi Khanbaba Tehrani and the Day of the Trial — Rojhelat.info
Xweza: In memory of Elî Kaşifpûr
Video
Famous Assassinations in World History
List of unsung executions
The Chain Murders: Killing Dissidents and Intellectuals, 1988-1998
Why Soleimani’s Death Is More Important Than Al-Baghdadi and Bin Laden

1957 births
1990 deaths